Surinder Pal may refer to:
Surinder Pal Singh Cheema - retired Vice Admiral of Indian Navy, former FOC-in-C of Western and Southern Naval Commands.
Surendra Pal - Indian Television actor.
Surinder Pal Ratawal - Indian politician, member of Bharatiya Janata Party.